Harold Greene may refer to:
 Harold Greene (journalist) (born 1943), journalist and news anchor
 Harold H. Greene (1923–2000), American federal judge
 Harold J. Greene (1959–2014), highest ranked U.S. casualty of the War in Afghanistan

See also
Harold Green (disambiguation)